Maktom Chaidey da Costa Nogueira (born 4 March 1998), commonly known as Maktom or Makton, is a Brazilian footballer who currently plays as a midfielder for Cruzeiro.

Career statistics

Club

Notes

References

1998 births
Living people
Brazilian footballers
Association football midfielders
América Futebol Clube (MG) players
Tombense Futebol Clube players
Cruzeiro Esporte Clube players
Campeonato Brasileiro Série A players